The World Archery Asia (WAA) formerly known as Asian Archery Federation (AAF) is the continental governing body of the sport of archery in Asia. It is affiliated to World Archery Federation (WAF). South Korean businessman Chung Eui-sun is the current president of the federation.

References

External links
Official Website
International Archery Federation's official website

World Archery Federation
Archery organizations 
Archery in Asia
Sports governing bodies in Asia